The California State University (Cal State or CSU) is a public university system in California. With 23 campuses and eight off-campus centers enrolling 485,550 students with 55,909 faculty and staff, CSU is the largest public university system in the United States. It is one of three public higher education systems in the state, with the other two being the University of California system and the California Community Colleges. The CSU system is incorporated as The Trustees of the California State University. The CSU system headquarters is located in Long Beach, California.

The CSU system was created in 1960 under the California Master Plan for Higher Education and it is a direct descendant of the California State Normal Schools chartered in 1857. With over 110,000 graduates annually, the CSU is the country's greatest producer of bachelor's degrees. The university system collectively sustains more than 209,000 jobs within the state.

In the 2015–16 academic year, CSU awarded 52 percent of newly issued California teaching credentials, 33 percent of the state's information technology bachelor's degrees, and it had more graduates in business (50 percent), criminal justice (50 percent), engineering (51 percent),  criminal justice (53 percent), public administration (60 percent), and agriculture (75 percent) than all other universities and colleges in California combined. Altogether, about half of the bachelor's degrees, one-fourth of the master's degrees, and three percent of the doctoral degrees awarded annually in California are from the CSU. Additionally, 62 percent of all bachelor's degrees granted to Hispanic students in California and over half of bachelor's degrees earned by California’s Latino, African American and Native American students combined are conferred by the CSU.

The CSU system is one of the top U.S. producers of graduates who move on to earn their PhD degrees in a related field. Since 1961, over four million alumni have received their bachelor's, master's, or doctoral degrees from the CSU system. CSU offers more than 1,800 degree programs in some 240 subject areas. In fall of 2015, 9,282 (or 39 percent) of CSU's 24,405 faculty were tenured or on the tenure track.

History

State Normal Schools

Today's California State University system is the direct descendant of the Minns Evening Normal School, founded in 1857 by George W. Minns in San Francisco. It was a normal school, an institution that educated future teachers in association with the high school system and the first of its kind in California.

The school was taken over by the state in 1862 and moved to San Jose and renamed the California State Normal School; it eventually evolved into San Jose State University. A southern branch of the California State Normal School was created in Los Angeles in 1882. In 1887, the California State Legislature dropped the word "California" from the name of the San Jose and Los Angeles schools, renaming them "State Normal Schools." 

Later, other state normal schools were founded at Chico (1887) and San Diego (1897); they did not form a system in the modern sense, in that each normal school had its own board of trustees and all were governed independently from one another. By the end of the 19th century, the State Normal School in San Jose was graduating roughly 130 teachers a year and was "one of the best known normal schools in the West."

In 1919, the State Normal School at Los Angeles became the Southern Branch of the University of California; in 1927, it became the University of California at Los Angeles (the "at" was later replaced with a comma in 1958).

State Teachers Colleges
 
In May 1921, the legislature enacted a comprehensive reform package for the state's educational system, which went into effect that July. The State Normal Schools were renamed State Teachers Colleges, their boards of trustees were dissolved, and they were brought under the supervision of the Division of Normal and Special Schools of the new California Department of Education located at the state capital in Sacramento. This meant that they were to be managed from Sacramento by the deputy director of the division, who in turn was subordinate to the State Superintendent of Public Instruction (the ex officio director of the Department of Education) and the State Board of Education. By this time it was already commonplace to refer to most of the campuses with their city names plus the word "state" (e.g., "San Jose State," "San Diego State," "San Francisco State").

The resulting administrative situation from 1921 to 1960 was quite complicated. On the one hand, the Department of Education's actual supervision of the presidents of the State Teachers Colleges was minimal, which translated into substantial autonomy when it came to day-to-day operations. According to Clark Kerr, J. Paul Leonard, the president of San Francisco State from 1945 to 1957, once boasted that "he had the best college presidency in the United States—no organized faculty, no organized student body, no organized alumni association, and...no board of trustees." On the other hand, the State Teachers Colleges were treated under state law as ordinary state agencies, which meant their budgets were subject to the same stifling bureaucratic financial controls as all other state agencies (except the University of California). At least one president would depart his state college because of his express frustration over that issue: Leonard himself.

During the 1920s and 1930s, the State Teachers Colleges started to evolve from normal schools (that is, vocational schools narrowly focused on training elementary school teachers in how to impart basic literacy to young children) into teachers colleges (that is, providing a full liberal arts education) whose graduates would be fully qualified to teach all K–12 grades. A leading proponent of this idea was Charles McLane, the first president of Fresno State, who was one of the earliest persons to argue that K–12 teachers must have a broad liberal arts education.  Having already founded Fresno Junior College in 1907 (now Fresno City College), McLane arranged for Fresno State to co-locate with the junior college and to synchronize schedules so teachers-in-training could take liberal arts courses at the junior college.  San Diego and San Jose followed Fresno in expanding their academic programs beyond traditional teacher training. These developments had the "tacit approval" of the State Board of Education and the State Superintendent of Public Instruction, but had not been expressly authorized by the board and also lacked express statutory authorization from the state legislature.

State Colleges

In 1932, the Carnegie Foundation for the Advancement of Teaching was asked by the state legislature and governor to perform a study of California higher education. The so-called "Suzzallo Report" (after the Foundation's president, Henry Suzzallo) sharply criticized the State Teachers Colleges for their intrusion upon UC's liberal arts prerogative and recommended their transfer to the Regents of the University of California (who would be expected to put them back in their proper place). This recommendation spectacularly backfired when the faculties and administrations of the State Teachers Colleges rallied to protect their independence from the Regents. In 1935, the State Teachers Colleges were formally upgraded by the state legislature to State Colleges and were expressly authorized to offer a full four-year liberal arts curriculum, culminating in bachelor's degrees, but they remained under the Department of Education.

During World War II, a group of local Santa Barbara leaders and business promoters (with the acquiescence of college administrators) were able to convince the state legislature and governor to transfer Santa Barbara State College to the University of California in 1944. After losing a second campus to UC, the state colleges' supporters arranged for the California state constitution to be amended in 1946 to prevent it from happening again.

The period after World War II brought a great expansion in the number of state colleges.  Additional state colleges were established in Los Angeles, Sacramento, and Long Beach from 1947 to 1949, and then seven more state colleges were authorized to be established between 1957 and 1960. Six more state colleges were founded after the enactment of the Donahoe Higher Education Act of 1960, bringing the total number to 23.

California State Colleges 

During the 1950s, the state colleges' peculiar mix of fiscal centralization and operational decentralization began to look rather incongruous in comparison to the highly centralized University of California (then on the brink of its own decentralization project) and the highly decentralized local school districts around the state which operated K–12 schools and junior colleges—all of which enjoyed much more autonomy from the rest of the state government than the state colleges.  In particular, several of the state college presidents had come to strongly dislike the State Board of Education and State Superintendent of Public Instruction Roy E. Simpson, whom the presidents felt were too deferential to the University of California.  Five state college presidents led the movement in the late 1950s for more autonomy from the state government: Glenn Dumke at San Francisco State (who had succeeded Leonard in 1957), Arnold Joyal at Fresno State, John T. Wahlquist at San Jose State, Julian A. McPhee at Cal Poly San Luis Obispo, and Malcolm Love at San Diego State.  They had three main objectives: (1) a systemwide board independent of the rest of the state government; (2) the right to award professional degrees in engineering and the doctorate in the field of education; and (3) state funding for research at the state college level.

The state legislature was limited to merely suggesting locations to the UC Board of Regents for the planned UC campus on the Central Coast. In contrast, because the state colleges lacked autonomy, they became vulnerable to pork barrel politics in the state legislature.  In 1959 alone, state legislators introduced separate bills to individually create nineteen state colleges.  Two years earlier, one bill that had actually passed had resulted in the creation of a new state college in Turlock, a town better known for its turkeys than its aspirations towards higher education, and which made no sense except that the chair of the Senate Committee on Education happened to be from Turlock.

In April 1960, the California Master Plan for Higher Education and the resulting Donahoe Higher Education Act finally granted autonomy to the state colleges.  The Donahoe Act merged all the state colleges into the State College System of California, severed them from the Department of Education (and also the State Board of Education and the State Superintendent of Public Instruction), and authorized the appointment of a systemwide board of trustees and a systemwide chancellor.  The board was initially known as the "Trustees of the State College System of California"; the word "board" was not part of the official name.  In March 1961, the state legislature renamed the system to the California State Colleges (CSC) and the board became the "Trustees of the California State Colleges."

As enacted, the Donahoe Act provides that UC "shall be the primary state-supported academic agency for research" and "has the sole authority in public higher education to award the doctoral degree in all fields of learning".  In contrast, CSU may only award the doctoral degree as part of a joint program with UC or "independent institutions of higher education" and is authorized to conduct research "in support of" its mission, which is to provide "undergraduate and graduate instruction through the master's degree."  This language reflects the intent of UC President Kerr and his allies to bring order to "a state of anarchy"—in particular, the state colleges' repeated attempts (whenever they thought UC was not looking) to quietly blossom into full-fledged research universities, as was occurring elsewhere with other state colleges like Michigan State.

Kerr explained in his memoirs: "The state did not need a higher education system where every component was intent on being another Harvard or Berkeley or Stanford."  As he saw it, the problem with such "academic drift" was that state resources would be spread too thin across too many universities, all would be too busy chasing the "holy grail of elite research status" (in that state college faculty members would inevitably demand reduced teaching loads to make time for research) for any of them to fulfill the state colleges' traditional role of training teachers, and then "some new colleges would have to be founded" to take up that role. At the time, California already had too many research universities; it had only 9 percent of the American population but 15 percent of the research universities (12 out of 80).  The language about joint programs and authorizing the state colleges to conduct some research was offered by Kerr at the last minute on December 18, 1959, as a "sweetener" to secure the consent of a then-wavering Dumke, the state colleges' representative on the Master Plan survey team.

Dumke reluctantly agreed to Kerr's terms only because he knew the alternative was worse.  If the state colleges could not reach a deal with UC, the California legislature was likely to be caught up in the "superboard" fad then sweeping through state legislatures across the United States.  A "superboard" was a state board of higher education with plenary authority over all public higher education in the state. The most logical candidate to become California's superboard was the existing UC Board of Regents, meaning the state colleges would be consigned to the dark fate they had narrowly escaped in 1935.  At least under Kerr's terms the state colleges would finally have their own systemwide board.  To ensure this compromise at the core of the Master Plan would stay intact through the legislative process, it was agreed that the entire package could be enacted only if the state legislature, the State Board of Education, and the UC Board of Regents all agreed with its two main components: (1) the joint doctorate and (2) the new board for the state colleges.

Most state college presidents and approximately 95 percent of state college faculty members (at the nine campuses where polls were held) strongly disagreed with the Master Plan's express endorsement of UC's primary role with respect to research and the doctorate, but they were still subordinate to the State Board of Education.  In January 1960, Louis Heilbron was elected as the new chair of the State Board of Education.  A Berkeley-trained attorney, Heilbron had already revealed his loyalty to his alma mater by joking that UC's ownership of the doctorate ought to be protected from "unreasonable search and seizure." He worked with Kerr to get the Master Plan's recommendations enacted in the form of the Donahoe Act, which was signed into state law on April 27, 1960.

Heilbron went on to serve as the first chairman of the Trustees of the California State Colleges (1960-1963), where he had to "rein in some of the more powerful campus presidents," improve the smaller and weaker campuses, and get all campuses accustomed to being managed for the first time as a system.  Heilbron set the "central theme" of his chairmanship by saying that "we must cultivate our own garden" (an allusion to Candide) and stop trying to covet someone else's.  Under Heilbron, the board also attempted to improve the quality of state college campus architecture, "in the hope that campuses no longer would resemble state prisons."  (For example, at the height of the Great Depression, the state government had considered converting Cal Poly San Luis Obispo into a state prison.)

Although the state colleges had reported to Sacramento since 1921, the board resolved on August 4, 1961 that the headquarters of the California State Colleges would be set up in the Los Angeles area, and in December, the newly-formed chancellor's office was moved from Sacramento to a rented office on Imperial Highway in Inglewood. This location gained the unfortunate nickname of the "imperial headquarters". In 1965, the chancellor's office was moved to a larger office space, again rented, on Wilshire Boulevard in Los Angeles.

Buell G. Gallagher was selected by the board as the first chancellor of the California State Colleges (1961-1962), but resigned after only nine unhappy months to return to his previous job as president of the City College of New York. Dumke succeeded him as the second chancellor of the California State Colleges (1962-1982).  As chancellor, Dumke faithfully adhered to the system's role as prescribed by the Master Plan, despite continuing resistance and resentment from state college dissidents who thought he had been "out-negotiated" and bitterly criticized the Master Plan as a "thieves' bargain". Disappointment with the Master Plan was widespread but was especially acute at Dumke's former campus, San Francisco State. Looking back, Kerr thought the state colleges had failed to appreciate the vast breadth of opportunities reserved to them by the Master Plan, as distinguished from UC's relatively narrow focus on basic research and the doctorate.  In any event, "Heilbron and Dumke got the new state college system off to an excellent start."

California State University and Colleges

In 1966, state assemblyman James R. Mills of San Diego proposed conducting a study of the prospect of renaming the system to the California State University, and much of the leadership on this issue came out of the San Diego area over the next few years.  After several bills from various San Diego legislators died in the face of strong resistance from the University of California, the final compromise (which squeaked through the state senate by a one-vote margin) was that the system would become the California State University and Colleges.  Governor Ronald Reagan signed Assembly Bill 123 into law on November 29, 1971.  The board was renamed the "Trustees of the California State University and Colleges".  The board also became known in the alternative as the "Board of Trustees," similar to how the Regents of the University of California are also known in the alternative as the Board of Regents.

In accordance with the new systemwide name, on May 23, 1972, the Board of Trustees voted to rename fourteen of the nineteen CSU campuses to "California State University," followed by a comma and then their geographic designation.  The five campuses exempted from renaming were the five newest state colleges created during the 1960s.

The new names were strongly disliked at certain campuses.  For example, CSUSF drew the humorous response "Gesundheit," and was frequently confused with CCSF, USF, and UCSF.  Over Dumke's objections, state assemblyman Alfred E. Alquist proposed a bill that would rename the San Jose campus back to San Jose State.  As passed and signed into law, the bill also renamed San Diego and San Francisco back to their old names. A few years later, the Sonoma and Humboldt campuses secured passage of similar legislation.

In September 1976, the chancellor's office was moved from Los Angeles to a custom-built headquarters at 400 Golden Shore on the Long Beach waterfront. This was the first time CSU had owned its own headquarters building.

California State University
 
Two major changes occurred in 1982. First, CSU was able to quietly obtain passage of a bill dropping the word "colleges" from its name.  Second, W. Ann Reynolds succeeded Dumke as CSU's third chancellor, and brought a dramatically different management style to the CSU system.   In many ways, Reynolds was the opposite of the "quiet" and "apolitical" Dumke.  Despite the severe budget pressures brought about by the passage of Proposition 13, Reynolds was able to achieve moderate success in improving parity between CSU and UC funding. She was unsuccessful in her other long-term objective, securing for CSU the right to award doctorates independently of UC.  When she asked Dumke for help, he replied that "he had given his word in 1960 and did not believe it principled to change."   A week later, he testified before the state legislature and did not support the independent doctorate for CSU.

Meanwhile, various problems with the 400 Golden Shore building forced the chancellor's office to move to a new building after only 22 years.   The solution was to trade spaces with the parking lot across the street to the north, a site with better soil conditions.  In spring 1998, CSU moved into its current headquarters at 401 Golden Shore, then demolished the old building and turned its site into a parking lot.

Today the campuses of the CSU system include comprehensive universities and polytechnic universities along with the only maritime academy in the western United States—one that receives aid from the U.S. Maritime Administration.

In May 2020, it was announced that all 23 institutions within the CSU system would host majority-online courses in the Fall 2020 semester as a result of the COVID-19 pandemic and the impact of the pandemic on education. Campuses are scheduled to return to in-person instruction by the end of 2022.

Governance

The governance structure of the California State University is largely determined by state law. The California State University is ultimately administered by the 25 member (24 voting, one non-voting) Board of Trustees of the California State University. The Trustees appoint the Chancellor of the California State University, who is the chief executive officer of the system, and the Presidents of each campus, who are the chief executive officers of their respective campuses.

The Academic Senate of the California State University, made up of elected representatives of the faculty from each campus, recommends academic policy to the Board of Trustees through the Chancellor.

Board of Trustees
The California State University is administered by the 25 member Board of Trustees (BOT). Regulations of the BOT are codified in Title 5 of the California Code of Regulations (CCR). The BOT is composed of:

 The Governor of California (president ex officio)
 Sixteen members who are appointed by the Governor of California with the consent of the Senate
 Two students from the California State University appointed by the Governor
 One tenured faculty member appointed by the Governor selected from a list of names submitted by the Academic Senate
 One representative of the alumni associations of the state university selected for a two-year term by the alumni council of the California State University
 Four ex officio members aside from the Governor:
 Lieutenant Governor
 Speaker of the Assembly
 State Superintendent of Public Instruction
 The CSU Chancellor

Chancellor

The position of the Chancellor is declared by statute and is defined by resolutions of the BOT. The delegation of authority from the BOT to the Chancellor was historically governed by a BOT resolution titled "Statement of General Principles in the Delegation of Authority and Responsibility" of August 4, 1961.  It is now controlled by the Standing Orders of the Board of Trustees of the California State University. Under the Standing Orders, the Chancellor is the chief executive officer of the CSU, and all Presidents report directly to the Chancellor.

Chancellors
Buell Gallagher (1961–1962)
Glenn S. Dumke (1962–1982)
W. Ann Reynolds (1982–1990)
Ellis E. McCune [interim] (1990–1991)
Barry Munitz (1991–1998)
Charles B. Reed (1998–2012)
Timothy P. White (2012–2020)
Joseph I. Castro (2021–2022)
Jolene Koester [interim] (2022–present)

Student government

All 23 campuses have mandatory student body organizations with mandatory fees, all with the "Associated Students" moniker, and are all members of the California State Student Association (CSSA). California Education Code § 89300 allows for the creation of student body organizations at any state university for the purpose of providing essential activities closely related to, but not normally included as a part of, the regular instructional program. A vote approved by two-thirds of all students causes the Trustees to fix a membership fee required of all regular, limited, and special session students attending the university such that all fee increases must be approved by the Trustees and a referendum approved by a majority of voters. Mandatory fee elections are called by the president of the university, and the membership fees are fixed by the Chancellor. All fees are collected by the university at the time of registration except where a student loan or grant from a recognized training program or student aid program has been delayed and there is reasonable proof that the funds will be forthcoming. The Gloria Romero Open Meetings Act of 2000 mandates that the legislative body of a student body organization conduct its business in public meetings.

Campuses
The CSU is composed of 23 campuses, of which 11 are located in Northern California and 12 in Southern California. The 23 campuses are listed here by order of the year founded:

* U.S. News & World Report ranks San Diego State and Fresno State in the National Universities category as they offer several Ph.D programs. The other universities in the California State University system are ranked in the Regional Universities (West) category as they offer few or no Ph.D programs.

^ Cal Maritime only awards undergraduate degrees and therefore is ranked separately from the other campuses of the California State University. It is ranked in the "Regional Colleges" category.

Off campus branches

A handful of universities have off campus branches that make education accessible in a large state. Unlike the typical university extension courses, they are degree-granting and students have the same status as other California State University students. The newest campus, the California State University, Channel Islands, was formerly an off campus branch of CSU Northridge. Riverside County and Contra Costa County, which have three million residents between them, have lobbied for their off campus branches to be free-standing California State University campuses. The total enrollment for all off campus branches of the CSU system in Fall 2005 was 9,163 students, the equivalent of 2.2 percent of the systemwide enrollment. The following are schools and their respective off campus branches:

California State University, Bakersfield
Antelope Valley (in Lancaster, California)
California State University, Chico
Redding (affiliated with Shasta College)
California State University, Fullerton
Garden Grove
California State University, East Bay
Concord
Oakland (Professional & Conference Center)
California State University, Fresno
Visalia
California State University, Los Angeles
Downtown Los Angeles
California State University, Monterey Bay
 Salinas (Professional & Conference Center)
California State University, San Bernardino
Palm Desert
California State University, San Marcos
Temecula/Murrieta
San Diego State University
Imperial Valley (in Brawley, California and Calexico, California)
SDSU-Georgia (in Tbilisi in the former Soviet Republic of Georgia)
San Francisco State University
Cañada College (in Redwood City, California)
Downtown Campus (in San Francisco, California)
California State University, Stanislaus
Stockton, California
Sonoma State University
Rohnert Park, California
CSU Maritime Academy
T.S. Golden Bear

Laboratories and observatories 

Research facilities owned and operated by units of the CSU:

 Desert Studies Center
 Research consortium and field site managed by California State University, Fullerton
 Moss Landing Marine Laboratories
 Independent degree-granting campus managed by San Jose State University
 Oceanographic laboratory located in the Monterey Bay area
Murillo Family Observatory
Newest research observatory in the San Bernardino Metropolitan Area and the CSU system. It is located in and managed by California State University, San Bernardino.
 Southern California Marine Institute
 Oceanographic laboratory in the Los Angeles Basin
 Mount Laguna Observatory
 Astronomical observatory part of the Astronomy Department of San Diego State University
 Telonicher Marine Laboratory at Cal Poly Humboldt in Trinidad, CA
 Marine research laboratory on the North California coast
 Home of the research vessel RV Coral Sea

Student profile

Differences between the CSU and UC systems

Both California public university systems are publicly funded higher education institutions. Despite having far fewer students, the largest UC campus, UCLA, as a result of its research emphasis and medical center, has a budget ($7.5 billion as of 2019) roughly equal to that of the entire CSU system ($7.2 billion as of 2019). According to a 2002 study, faculty at the CSU spend about 30 hours a week teaching and advising students and about 10 hours a week on research/creative activities, while a 1984 study reports faculty at the UC spend about 26 hours a week teaching and advising students and about 23 hours a week on research/creative activities. CSU's Chancellor, Dr. Charles B. Reed, pointed out in his Pullias Lecture at the University of Southern California that California was big enough to afford two world-class systems of public higher education, one that supports research (UC) and one that supports teaching (CSU). However, student per capita spending is lower at CSU, and that, together with the lack of a research mission or independent doctoral programs under the California Master Plan, has led some in American higher education to develop the perception that the CSU system is less prestigious than the UC system. Kevin Starr, the seventh State Librarian of California, stated that the "University of California drew from the top ten percent of the state's high school graduates" while "the CSU system was expected to draw its students from the top 33 percent of each graduating high school class." However, per the California Master Plan, the UC draws from the top 12.5 percent of California's public high school graduates.

According to the California Master Plan for Higher Education (1960), both university systems may confer bachelors or master's degrees as well as professional certifications, however only the University of California has the authority to issue Ph.D degrees (Doctor of Philosophy) and professional degrees in the fields of law, medicine, veterinary, and dentistry. As a result of recent legislation (SB 724 and AB 2382), the California State University may now offer the Ed.D (also known as the Doctor of Education or "education doctorate degree") and DPT (Doctor of Physical Therapy) degrees to its graduate students. Additionally, the California State University (CSU) offers Ph.D degrees and some professional doctorates (for instance, audiology, Au.D) as a "joint degree" in combination with other institutions of higher education, including "joint degrees" with the University of California (UC) and accredited private universities. This is why, for instance, San Diego State can qualify as a "Doctoral University: High Research Activity" by offering some 22 doctoral degrees.

There are 23 CSU campuses and 10 UC campuses representing approximately 437,000 and 237,000 students respectively. The cost of CSU tuition is approximately half that of UC. Thus, the CSU system has been referred to by former California State University authorities as "The People's University."

CSU and UC use the terms "president" and "chancellor" internally in opposite ways: At CSU, the campuses are headed by presidents who report to a systemwide chancellor; but at UC, they are headed by chancellors who report to a systemwide president. 

CSU has traditionally been more accommodating to older students than UC, by offering more degree programs in the evenings and, more recently, online. In addition, CSU schools, especially in more urban areas, have traditionally catered to commuters, enrolling most of their students from the surrounding area. This has changed as CSU schools increase enrollment and some of the more prestigious urban campuses attract a wider demographic.

The majority of CSU campuses operate on the semester system while UC campuses operate on the quarter system (with the exception of UC Berkeley, UC Merced, the UCLA medical school, and all UC law schools). As of Fall 2014, the CSU began converting its six remaining quarter campuses to the semester calendar. Cal State LA and Cal State Bakersfield converted in Fall 2016, while Cal State East Bay and Cal Poly Pomona transitioned to semesters in Fall 2018. Cal State San Bernardino is planning to make the conversion in Fall 2020, while Cal Poly San Luis Obispo has not announced a date for conversion to semesters.

Admissions

Historically the requirements for admission to the CSU have been less stringent than the UC system.  However, both systems require completion of the A-G requirements in high school as part of admission. The CSU attempts to accept applicants from the top one-third of California high school graduates. In contrast, the UC attempts to accept the top one-eighth. In an effort to maintain a 60/40 ratio of upper division students to lower division students and to encourage students to attend a California community college first, both university systems give priority to California community college transfer students.

However, the following 17 CSU campuses use higher standards than the basic admission standards due to the number of qualified students who apply which makes admissions at these schools more competitive:

 Chico 
 Fresno
 Fullerton
 Humboldt (freshmen)
 Long Beach
 Los Angeles
 Monterey Bay (freshmen)
 Northridge
 Pomona
 Sacramento
 San Bernardino
 San Diego
 San Francisco
 San Jose
 San Luis Obispo
 San Marcos
 Sonoma

Furthermore, seven California State University campuses are fully impacted for both freshmen and transfers, meaning in addition to admission into the school, admission into all majors is also impacted for the academic 2020-2021 program. The seven campuses that are fully impacted are Los Angeles, Fresno, Fullerton, Long Beach, San Diego, San Jose, and San Luis Obispo.

Research and academics

The California State University (CSU) and most of its campuses are members of Association of Public and Land-grant Universities (APLU) and the American Association of State Colleges and Universities (AASCU).

The CSU is a founding and charter member of CENIC, the Corporation for Education Network Initiatives in California, the nonprofit organization which provides extremely high-performance Internet-based networking to California's K–20 research and education community.

The CSU intends to expand its post-graduate education focus to establish and encourage Professional Science master's degree (PSM) programs using the Sloan model.

The California State University Program for Education and Research in Biotechnology (CSUPERB) mission is to develop a professional biotechnology workforce. CSUPERB provides grant funding, organizes an annual symposium, sponsors industry-responsive curriculum, and serves as a liaison for the CSU with government, philanthropic, educational, and biotechnology industry partners. The program involves students and faculty from Life, Physical, Computer and Clinical Science, Engineering, Agriculture, Math and Business departments at all 23 CSU campuses.

The Hospitality Management Education Initiative (HMEI) was formed in 2008 to address the shortage of hospitality leaders in California. HMEI is a collaboration between the 14 CSU campuses that have hospitality-related degrees and industry executives. CSU awarded 95% of hospitality bachelor's degrees in the state in 2011.

ABET (Accreditation Board for Engineering and Technology) is the recognized U.S. accreditor of college and university programs in applied and natural science, computing, engineering, and engineering technology. The California State University has 18 colleges with ABET-accredited engineering programs (Pomona, San Luis Obispo, Maritime, Chico, Dominguez Hills, East Bay, Fresno, Fullerton, Long Beach, Los Angeles, Northridge, Sacramento, San Bernardino, Humboldt, San Diego, San Francisco, and San José).

The CSU Council on Ocean Affairs, Science & Technology (CSU COAST) affinity group is the umbrella organization for marine, coastal, and coastal watershed-related activities. A highly effective CSU affinity group with active faculty and administration members across each of the system's 23 campuses, CSU COAST functions primarily as a coordinating force to stimulate new research, teaching, and policy tools via administrative support, robust networking opportunities, and by providing small incubator/accelerator funding to students and faculty.

Impact

The CSU confers over 110,000 degrees each year, awarding almost half of the state's bachelor's degrees and one-fourth of the state's master's degrees. The entire 23 campus system sustains over 209,000 jobs statewide, generating $1.6 billion in tax revenue. Total CSU related expenditures equate to $26.9 billion.

The CSU produces 62% of the bachelor's degrees awarded in agriculture, 54% in business, 44% in health and medicine, 64% in hospitality and tourism, 45% in engineering, and 44% of those in media, culture and design. The CSU is the state's largest source of educators, with more than half of the state's newly credentialed teachers coming from the CSU, expanding the state's rank of teachers by nearly 12,500 per year.

Over the last 10 years, the CSU has significantly enhanced programs towards the underserved. 56% of bachelor's degrees granted to Latinos in the state are from the CSU, while 60% of bachelor's awarded to Filipinos were from the CSU. In the Fall of 2008, 42% of incoming students were from California Community Colleges.

Campus naming conventions
The UC system follows a consistent style in the naming of campuses, using the words "University of California" followed by the name of its declared home city, with a comma as the separator. Most CSU campuses follow a similar pattern, though several are named only for their home city or county, such as San Francisco State University, San Jose State University, San Diego State University, or Sonoma State University.

In addition, the California Maritime Academy (Cal Maritime) is the only campus whose official name does not refer to a city or regional location within California. Channel Islands, Maritime, and San Marcos are the only campuses whose names do not include a comma. Some critics, including Donald Gerth (former President of Sacramento State), have claimed that the weak California State University identity has contributed to the CSU's perceived lack of prestige when compared to the University of California.

The three polytechnic universities of the system do not follow any of the naming standards for the rest of the CSU campuses. California Polytechnic State University, San Luis Obispo, California State Polytechnic University, Humboldt, and California State Polytechnic University, Pomona use the word "polytechnic" in both their full names (but in different word orders) per California Education Code section 89000. and section 89005.5 CSU's editorial style guide refers to the same formal names while they also refer to the abbreviated forms "Cal Poly San Luis Obispo", "Cal Poly Humboldt", and "Cal Poly Pomona" respectively, but not the name "Cal Poly" by itself. Cal Poly San Luis Obispo unilaterally claims the "Cal Poly" name per its own marketing brand guides and, since the 1980s, the CSU Chancellor's Office has taken numerous small and medium-sized businesses to court on Cal Poly San Luis Obispo's behalf for not having a licensing agreement to sell merchandise with the words "Cal Poly".

See also
 California State University Employees Union
 California State University Emeritus and Retired Faculty Association
 California State University Police Department
 List of colleges and universities in California

References

Further reading
 Donald R. Gerth. The People's University: A History of the California State University. Berkeley: Institute of Governmental Studies, University of California, 2010. .

External links

 

 
C
Schools accredited by the Western Association of Schools and Colleges
 California State University system
Educational institutions established in 1857
1857 establishments in California